The Chinese Ambassador to Botswana is the official representative of the People's Republic of China to Botswana.

List of representatives

Republic of China

People's Republic of China

See also
Botswana–China relations

References 

Ambassadors of China to Botswana
Botswana
China